Eochaid ua Flannacáin (935–1004) was an Irish cleric and poet.

Life

Eochaid was the author of more than twenty surviving quasi-historical, genealogical and topographical poems, many of which were incorporated into Lebor Gabala Erenn. He was a member of Clann Sinaich, an ecclesiastical family of Armagh. At the time of his death he was superior (abbot or prior) of Clonfeacle and Lios Aoigheadh (unidentified). One of his sons, and several of his descendants, were abbots of Armagh.

Obit

The Annals of Ulster contain Eochaid's obit sub anno 1004, stating:

Commemorative verse

The obit was accompanied by a stanza commemorating him:

References

 Eochaid ua Flannacáin, by Nollaig Ó Muraíle, in  Encyclopaedia of Ireland, ed. Brian Lalor, Gill & Macmillan, Baile Átha Cliath, 2003.

External links
 http://www.ucc.ie/celt/published/T100001A/index.html

10th-century Irish abbots
10th-century Irish poets
People from County Armagh
Medieval European scribes
Irish scribes
Irish male poets
935 births
1004 deaths
Irish-language writers